Linus Lichtschlag (born 4 September 1988, Berlin) is a German rower. He participated in the 2012 Summer Olympics in London where he competed in the Men's lightweight double sculls event together with his teammate Lars Hartig. They qualified for the A finals, where they reached a sixth place.  The team had previously won gold at the 2010 European Championships in the same event.

References

1988 births
Living people
Rowers at the 2012 Summer Olympics
German male rowers
Olympic rowers of Germany
World Rowing Championships medalists for Germany
Rowers from Berlin
21st-century German people